Masks and Faces is a 1917 British silent biographical film directed by Fred Paul and starring Johnston Forbes-Robertson, Irene Vanbrugh and Henry S. Irving. The film depicts episodes from the life of the eighteenth-century Irish actress Peg Woffington. It is based on the 1852 play Masks and Faces by Charles Reade and Tom Taylor.

Cast

References

External links
 

1917 films
British biographical films
British drama films
British silent feature films
Films directed by Fred Paul
Ideal Film Company films
Films set in London
Films set in the 18th century
British black-and-white films
1910s English-language films
1910s British films
Silent drama films